The Moscow Art Theatre production of The Seagull in 1898, directed by Konstantin Stanislavski and Vladimir Nemirovich-Danchenko, was a crucial milestone for the fledgling theatre company that has been described as "one of the greatest events in the history of Russian theatre and one of the greatest new developments in the history of world drama." It was the first production in Moscow of Anton Chekhov's 1896 play The Seagull, though it had been performed with only moderate success in St. Petersburg two years earlier. Nemirovich, who was a friend of Chekhov's, overcame the writer's refusal to allow the play to appear in Moscow after its earlier lacklustre reception and convinced Stanislavski to direct the play for their innovative and newly founded Moscow Art Theatre (MAT). The MAT's success was due to the fidelity of its delicate representation of everyday life, its intimate, ensemble playing, and the resonance of its mood of despondent uncertainty with the psychological disposition of the Russian intelligentsia of the time. To commemorate this historic production, which gave the MAT its sense of identity, the company to this day bears the seagull as its emblem.

Cast
 Irina Nikolayevna Arkadina: Olga Knipper
 Konstantin Gavrilovich Treplyov: Vsevolod Meyerhold

 Masha: Maria Lilina
 Boris Alexeyevich Trigorin: Konstantin Stanislavski

Stanislavski's directorial conception
While visiting his brother's estate near Kharkiv in August 1898, Stanislavski began work on his production plan (or his directorial "score" as he came to call it) for the play, into which he incorporated his sensory experiences of the Russian countryside there. He storyboarded key moments of the play with small drawings that gave the actor's spatial and proxemic relationships. He also detailed individual rhythms, physical lives and mannerisms for each character:

The score indicates when the actors will "wipe away dribble, blow their noses, smack their lips, wipe away sweat, or clean their teeth and nails with matchsticks." This tight control of the mise en scène was intended to facilitate the unified expression of the inner action that Stanislavski perceived to be hidden beneath the surface of the play in its subtext. Vsevolod Meyerhold, the director and practitioner whom Stanislavski on his death-bed declared to be "my sole heir in the theatre—here or anywhere else", and the actor who played Konstantin in this production, described years later the poetic effect of Stanislavski's treatment of the play:

Stanislavski's directorial score was published in 1938.

Production process

As an actor, despite wishing to play Trigorin, Stanislavski initially prepared the role of the doctor Dorn, at Nemirovich's insistence. When Chekhov attended rehearsals for the production in September 1898, however, he felt that the performance of Trigorin was weak, which resulted in a re-casting; Stanislavski took over Trigorin and Nemirovich apologised for having kept the role from him. Olga Knipper (Chekhov's future wife) played Arkadina.

The production had 80 hours of rehearsal in total, spread over 24 sessions: 9 with Stanislavski and 15 with Nemirovich. Despite this, a considerable length by the standards of the conventional practice of the day, Stanislavski felt it was under-rehearsed and threatened to have his name removed from the posters when Nemirovich refused his demand to postpone its opening by a week.

Performance and reception
In a letter to Chekhov, one audience member described how:

Nemirovich described the applause, which came after a prolonged silence, as bursting from the audience like a dam breaking. The production received unanimous praise from the press.

It was not until  that Chekhov saw the production, in a performance without sets but in make-up and costumes at the Paradiz Theatre. He praised the production but was less keen on Stanislavski's own performance; he objected to the "soft, weak-willed tone" in his interpretation (shared by Nemirovich) of Trigorin and entreated Nemirovich to "put some spunk into him or something". He proposed that the play be published with Stanislavski's score of the production's mise en scène. Chekhov's collaboration with Stanislavski proved crucial to the creative development of both men. Stanislavski's attention to psychological realism and ensemble playing coaxed the buried subtleties from the play and revived Chekhov's interest in writing for the stage. Chekhov's unwillingness to explain or expand on the script forced Stanislavski to dig beneath the surface of the text in ways that were new in theatre.

See also
 Moscow Art Theatre
 The Seagull
 Moscow Art Theatre production of Hamlet

References

Sources

 Allen, David. 2001. Performing Chekhov. London: Routledge. .
 Balukhaty, Sergei Dimitrievich, ed. The Seagull Produced By Stanislavsky. Trans. David Magarshack. London: Denis Dobson. New York: Theatre Arts Books.  
 Banham, Martin, ed. 1998. The Cambridge Guide to Theatre. Cambridge: Cambridge UP. .
 Benedetti, Jean. 1989. Stanislavski: An Introduction. Revised edition. Original edition published in 1982. London: Methuen. .
 ---. 1999. Stanislavski: His Life and Art. Revised edition. Original edition published in 1988. London: Methuen. .
 Braun, Edward. 1982. "Stanislavsky and Chekhov". The Director and the Stage: From Naturalism to Grotowski. London: Methuen. p. 59-76. . 
 Chekhov, Anton. 1920. Letters of Anton Chekhov to His Family and Friends with Biographical Sketch. Trans. Constance Garnett. New York: Macmillan. Full text available online at Gutenberg
 Golub, Spencer. 1998. "Stanislavsky, Konstantin (Sergeevich)." In Banham (1998, 1032-1033). 
 Rudnitsky, Konstantin. 1981. Meyerhold the Director. Trans. George Petrov. Ed. Sydney Schultze. Revised translation of Rezhisser Meierkhol'd. Moscow: Academy of Sciences, 1969. .
 Worrall, Nick. 1996. The Moscow Art Theatre. Theatre Production Studies ser. London and NY: Routledge. .

External links

Seagull (MAT)
Seagull
Theatre in Russia
Stage productions of plays